The Dorian Awards are film and television accolades given by GALECA: The Society of LGBTQ Entertainment Critics, founded in 2009 as the Gay and Lesbian Entertainment Critics Association. GALECA is an association of professional journalists and critics who regularly report on movies and/or TV for print, online, and broadcast outlets in the United States, Canada, Australia, and the United Kingdom. As of March 2023, GALECA listed approximately 420 members, including those on its advisory board. The awards recognize the best in film and television, with categories ranging from general to LGBTQ-centric. 

The Dorian Award is named in honor of the writer Oscar Wilde, in reference to his novel The Picture of Dorian Gray, and the original award was a simple certificate with an image of the noted author and playwright, along with a graphic of hands holding a black bow tie.

In 2019, the award was redesigned to mimic a cue card. Since the group's first televised awards special, Dorians TV Toast 2020, first shown on the streaming platform Revry on September 12, 2020, winners have received a small illustrated portrait of themselves or a memorable scene from their project. During GALECA's Dorians Film Toast 2021 special (airing April 18, 2021), actress Carey Mulligan, in accepting the group's Best Film Performance—Actress award for her work in Promising Young Woman, said her Dorian "might be the coolest prize I've ever seen."

Format
The Dorian Awards honor film and television at separate times of the year. Dorian film nominees and winners for the previous calendar year are announced in January and February, while TV nominees and winners for the previous television season are typically announced in June and August. In addition to more traditional categories such as Film of the Year and Best TV Comedy, the Dorians include more novel categories, including Unsung TV Show, Visually Striking Film, Wilde Wit and Campy Flick, an honor that has generated amusement from The New York Times.

Rather than present an official awards ceremony, GALECA typically hosts its annual "Dorian Awards Winners Toast," an informal day party in Los Angeles for members, winners, nominees, and associates. For the 2020 Toast, Antonio Banderas, the group's choice for 2019 Film Performance of the Year—Actor, and actress-director Olivia Wilde, named "Wilde" Artist of the Year, were among the honored guests.

In 2018, the Society's Executive Director, John Griffiths, announced that the group was planning to separate the Dorian film and TV awards' timelines, with movie award winners revealed each January and TV honors in June.

In September 2020, GALECA presented its first televised awards, Dorians TV Toast 2020, a pre-recorded two hour special with appearances by performers and producers such as Hugh Jackman, Janelle Monáe, Billy Porter, Margaret Cho, Josh Thomas, Regina King, Dan Levy, Laverne Cox, John Oliver, Chad Michaels, Thomas Roberts, Fiona Shaw, Annie Murphy, Alex Newell and Damon Lindelof. The program, shown on LGBTQ+ streaming platform Revry, was hosted by broadcasting veteran and LGBTQ rights activist Charles Karel Bouley and included segments where he and other GALECA members discussed the merits of the contenders in various categories.

Bouley, known simply as Karel, also hosted the group's Dorians Film Toast 2021, this time a three-hour special on Revry featuring Carey Mulligan, Daniel Kaluuya, Chloé Zhao, Lee Daniels George C. Wolfe, Radha Blank, Lee Isaac Chung, Cynthia Nixon, Gabourey Sidibe, Rachel McAdams, Isabel Sandoval, Colman Domingo, Rafael L. Silva, Harry Hamlin, Jesse Tyler Ferguson, Deven Green, Leslie Jordan, Emerald Fennell, California governor Gavin Newsom, Charo, Cox and Michaels and other stars. "Wilde Artist" recipient Dolly Parton did not appear in the show to accept that special award ("to a truly groundbreaking force in film, theater, and/or television"), but said in a statement: "I’m not sure I’m as edgy as past winners (in the Wilde Artist category) like Todd Haynes, Kate McKinnon, Lin-Manuel Miranda and Jordan Peele — but I am honored and humbled. I appreciate all of you entertainment journalists who are so passionate and are working so hard. Keep up the good work!”

A third awards special, Dorians TV Toast 2021, streamed on Here TV and its YouTube channel Planet Out, and later on-demand on Tubi. Bowen Yang, Jean Smart, Ziwe, Jennifer Beals, Michaela Jaé Rodriguez, Stephen Fry, Nick Kroll, Olivia Newton-John, Tituss Burgess, Fran Drescher,  Michael Cimino, Josie Totah, Big Freedia, Russell T Davies, Gottmik, Callum Scott Howells, Steven Canals, Hannah Einbinder, Jim J. Bullock, Jeffrey Bowyer-Chapman, Paapa Essiedu, Paul W. Downs, Jesse James Keitel, and Eurovision Song Contest host Edsilia Rombley were among the participants. In a unique moment, actor-comedian John Lehr impersonated gay cable news polling expert Steve Kornacki in presenting three categories.

Membership
Honorary GALECA members and advisors include esteemed former film critics David Ansen and Kevin Thomas, groundbreaking lesbian journalist Judy Wieder (former editor-in-chief of The Advocate), broadcasting veteran Jane Velez-Mitchell, columnist Michael Musto, former Jezebel editor-in-chief and Teen Vogue online executive editor Koa Beck, Princeton University Dean of the College and feminist writer Jill Dolan, noted film critic and talk show host Bobby Rivers, and professor of literature Joseph Bristow, one of the world's leading authorities on Oscar Wilde.

"Ten Best" lists
To commemorate the 2015 film and TV awards season, GALECA revealed its first "Ten Best" list, The Ten Best Movies About the Academy Awards. Included were such films as The Oscar, California Suite, For Your Consideration, and The Bodyguard. More recently, the group's lists include the Ten Best LGBTQ Movies Every Straight Person Should See, Ten Best Actresses of All Time, and Ten Best Films You Didn't Know Were LGBTQ.

Dorians Toast theme songs
Four original songs have been written for GALECA's Dorian Awards Toast streaming specials: "Look Into the Light", a pop ballad about the power of movies, and "A Toast!", both sung by Morgan Mallory and written and composed by Mallory and Charles Karel Bouley; an expanded, faster-paced variation on the latter performed by Dave Rooney of The Black Donnellys with additional lyrics by Bouley and Rooney; and "Flickering Life", a pop rock tune about the power of TV also composed and sung by Mallory with lyrics by him and Bouley.

History
GALECA and its annual Dorian Awards were created in 2008 in Hollywood, California, by Griffiths, former long-time television critic for Us Weekly magazine and contributor to Emmy Magazine of the Academy of Television Arts & Sciences.

The first Dorian Awards, for the 2009's best in both film and TV, were announced in January 2010 (nominees were revealed the previous month). GALECA's Dorian Award film and TV nominees and winners for 2010 productions were announced in January 2011. Following suit, 2011's Dorian Award nominees and ultimate honorees were revealed in January 2012. The Dorian nominees and winners for 2012 productions were announced in January 2013, and so on.

In 2019, GALECA joined forces with the African-American Film Critics Association, Latino Entertainment Journalists Association (LEJA), the entertainment and features arm of the Asian American Journalists Association, the Online Association of Female Film Critics, and Time's Up Entertainment's CRITICAL initiative to form Critics Groups for Equality in Media (CGEM), to promote diversity in journalism. Time's Up, enmeshed in controversy, eventually dropped out of the alliance ahead of ceasing its programs in January 2023.

Due to COVID 19 pandemic's effects on the film business, for its 2021 film awards, GALECA adjusted its window of eligibility to movies released in 2020 and the first two months of 2021. The 2022 Dorian film awards considered movies released in the remaining months of 2021. In that two-year period, award contenders vied for "Best Film" rather than "Film of the Year," which the group restored 2023.

2023 (Film) 
Sources -

2021-22 (Television)
Sources -

2022 (Film) 
Sources -

2020-21 (Television)
Sources -

2020 (Film) 
Sources -

2019-2020 (Television) 
Sources -

2019 
Sources -

2018
Sources -

2017

2016

2015

2014

George Takei, LGBTQ rights activist and co-star of Star Trek, thanked GALECA in a YouTube video for naming him their 2014 choice for Timeless Star.

2013

In 2013, Sir Ian McKellen expressed gratitude to members for honoring him with their 2012 Timeless Star career achievement honor, writing in a note to the group, "I shall try to live up to Galeca's approval." James Franco, recipient of GALECA's special Wilde Artist of the Year award in 2013, thanked the group by posting a mini art piece noting his honor on Instagram.

2012
Sources -

2011
Sources -

2010
Sources -

2009
Sources -

References

External links
 galeca.org

American film awards
American television awards
LGBT portrayals in mass media
LGBT film awards